This is a list of NCAA men's Division III ice hockey tournament all-time records, updated through the 2022 tournament.

† Plattsburgh's appearances from 1986 through 1988 were later vacated by the NCAA.Teams in italics no longer play at the Division III level.

Record by conference
As of 2022

Defunct conferences in italics

References

All-Time Team Tecords